Stephen Rowe is an Australian country singer from Broken Hill, NSW, Australia. Australian Country Superstar Tania Kernaghan has been credited with giving him his first real break.

A recent album of his features Willie Chambers of The Chambers Brothers fame.

References

External links
 http://stephenroweart.com/

Australian country singers
Year of birth missing (living people)
Living people